The New Zealand cricket team toured India from 26 September 2003 to 15 November 2003. The tour included two Tests and six ODIs as part of the  TVS Cup Tri series which also involved Australia.

Squads

 * Sourav Ganguly played only two matches in ODI series.
 ** Chris Cairns captained the New Zealand side for one match.

Tests

1st Test

2nd Test

TVS cup Tri Series

The 2003–04 TVS cup was a triangular One Day International cricket tournament, played by India, New Zealand and Australia. The tournament was held in India from 23 October 2003 to 18 November 2003, and consisted of a round robin stage, in which each nation played each of the others three times. The top two teams at the end of the round robin stage then played the final match of the series.

In a close round robin, India with 16 points and Australia with 28 points from the group stage qualified for the final; New Zealand finished last with 10 points, and did not qualify for the final. Australia beat India by 37 runs in the final.

References

External links
 

New Zealand cricket tours of India
Indian cricket seasons from 2000–01
International cricket competitions in 2003–04
2003 in Indian cricket
2003 in New Zealand cricket